Dabang Mumbai (abbreviated as DBM) is a field hockey team based in Mumbai, Maharashtra, India, that plays in the Coal India Hockey India League (HIL). The aim is to build a team for the eight-time Olympic Champions, India be able to compete at the highest level of world hockey. It is owned by DoIT Sports Management. Australia coach Jay Stacy serves as the head coach for the team.

Franchisee details

Ownership
The team is owned by DoIT Sports Management (India) Pvt Ltd, which was incorporated as a part of DoIT Creations Group with the vision of promoting sports, athletes, sports facilities and events across India. The company entered the Indian sports eco-system with its first acquisition in the Pro Kabaddi League 2014 with the purchase of the Delhi franchise – Dabang Delhi KC. DoIT Creations has established the Indian School of Design and Innovation (‘ISDI’) in Mumbai in collaboration with Parsons - The New School for Design, New York City in 2013. DoIT recently acquired a strategic stake in the established Business World (BW) magazine. With Dabang Mumbai, DoIT Sports entered into Hockey India League with the primary focus towards development and growth of Indian Hockey. DoIT Sports is also committed to support women's sports development programs across the sports demographic dividend of India.

Technical alliance
Dabang Mumbai HC, a franchise of the Hero Hockey India League (HIL), is the first team in the league to enter into a Technical Partnership with Europe-based and one of the most successful club HC Bloemendaal. This promising partnership is to enhance the grass-root training structure in Mumbai and adjoining regions with an aim to produce future hockey stars for India.

2017 squad

Fixtures

2015

Sponsors and kit manufacturers

References

Hockey India League teams
Indian field hockey clubs